Nickson is an English surname. Notable people with the surname include:

Arthur Nickson (1902–1974), British writer of western fiction
David Nickson, Baron Nickson (born 1929), British businessman
Elizabeth Nickson, Canadian journalist
George Nickson (1864–1924), Anglican bishop
Hilda Nickson aka Hilda Pressley (1912–1977), British writer of romance novels
J. J. Nickson (1915–1985), American physician
Julia Nickson (born 1958), Singaporean-born American actress 
Nick Nickson (born 1953), American sportscaster
Susan Nickson (born 1982), English television screenwriter

See also 
 Nixon (disambiguation)

English-language surnames
Patronymic surnames
Surnames from given names